Spani is a surname. Notable people with the surname include:

Spani family
Pjetër Spani (disambiguation), multiple people
D. D. Spani, American architect 
Gary Spani (born 1956), American football player
Hina Spani (1896–1969), Argentine soprano
Prospero Spani (1516–1584), Italian sculptor